Charles Morton (October 1, 1916 – December 20, 1996) was an American cyclist. He competed in three events at the 1936 Summer Olympics.

References

External links
 

1916 births
1996 deaths
American male cyclists
Olympic cyclists of the United States
Cyclists at the 1936 Summer Olympics
Sportspeople from Long Beach, California